A system of taxonomy of the cryptogams, the Smith system was published in
Smith, G.M. (1938). Cryptogamic Botany, vol. 1. Algae and fungi. McGraw-Hill, New York.
Smith, G.M. (1955). Cryptogamic Botany, vol. 2. Bryophytes and pteridophytes. 2nd ed. McGraw-Hill, New York.

Division Chlorophyta 

Class 1. Chlorophyceae
Order 1. Volvocales
Family 1. Chlamydomonadaceae
Family 2. Volvocaceae
Order 2. Tetrasporales
Order 3. Ulotrichales
Family 1. Ulotrichaceae
Family 2. Microsporaceae
Family 3. Cylindrocapsaceae
Family 4. Chaetophoraceae
Family 5. Protococcaceae
Family 6. Coleochaetaceae
Family 7. Trentepohliaceae
Order 4. Ulvales
Family 1. Ulvaceae
Family 2 Schizomeridaceae
Order 5. Schizogoniales
Family Schizogoniaceae
Order 6. Cladophorales
Family 1. Cladophoraceae
Family 2. Sphaeropleaceae
Order 7. Oedogoniales
Family Oedogoniaceae
Order 8. Zygnematales
Family 1. Zygnemataceae
Family 2. Mesotaeniaceae
Family 3. Desmidiaceae
Order 9. Chlorococcales
Family 1. Chlorococcaceae
Family 2. Endosphaeraceae
Family 3. Characiaceae
Family 4. Protosiphonaceae
Family 5. Hydrodictyaceae
Family 6. Oöcystaceae
Family 7. Scenedesmaceae
Order 10. Siphonales
Family 1. Bryopsidaceae
Family 2. Caulerpaceae
Family 3. Halicystaceae
Family 4. Codiaceae
Family 5. Derbesiaceae
Family 6. Vaucheriaceae
Family 7. Phyllosiphonaceae
Order 11. Siphonocladiales
Family 1. Valoniaceae
Family 2. Dasycladaceae
Class 2. Charophyceae
Order Charales
Family Characeae

Division Euglenophyta 

Order 1. Euglenales
Order 2. Colaciales (Euglenocapsales)

Division Pyrrophyta 

Class 1. Cryptophyceae
Class 2. Desmokontae
Class 3. Dinophyceae
Order 1. Gymnodiniales
Order 2. Peridiniales
Order 3. Dinophysidales
Order 4. Rhyzodiniales
Order 5. Dinocapsales
Order 6. Dinotrichales
Order 7. Dinococcales

Division Chrysophyta 

Class 1. Xanthophyceae (Heterokontae)
Order 1. Heterochloridales
Order 2. Rhizochloridales
Order 3. Heterocapsales
Order 4. Heterotrichales
Order 5. Heterococcales
Order 6. Heterosiphonales
Class 2. Chrysophyceae
Order 1. Chrysomonadales
Suborder 1. Cromulinae
Suborder 2. Isochrysidineae
Suborder 3. Ochromonadineae
Order 2. Rhizochrysidales
Order 3. Chrysocapsales
Order 4. Chrysotrichales
Order 5. Chrysosphaerales
Class 3. Bacillariophyceae
Order 1. Centrales
Order 2. Pennales

Division Phaeophyta 

Class 1. Isogeneratae
Order 1. Ectocarpales
Order 2. Sphacelariales
Order 3. Tilopteridales
Order 4. Cutleriales
Order 5. Dictyotales
Class 2. Heterogeneratae
Subclass 1. Haplostichineae
Order 1. Chordariales
Order 2. Sporochnales
Order 3. Desmarestiales
Subclass 2. Polystichineae
Order 1. Punctariales
Order 2. Dictyosiphonales
Order 3. Laminariales
Class 3. Cyclosporeae
Order Fucales

Division Cyanophyta 

Class Myxophyceae (Cyanophyceae)
Order 1. Chroococcales
Order 2. Chamaesiphonales
Order 3. Hormogonales

Division Rhodophyta 

Class Rhodophyceae
Subclass 1. Bangioideae
Order Bangiales
Subclass 2. Florideae
Order 1. Nemalionales
Order 2. Gelidiales
Order 3. Cryptonemiales
Order 4. Gigartinales
Order 5. Rhodymeniales
Order 6. Ceramiales

Division Myxothallophyta 

Class 1. Myxomycetae
Subclass 1. Endosporeae
Subclass 2. Exosporeae
Class 2. Phytomyxinae
Class 3. Acrasieae

Division Eumycetae 

Class 1. Phycomycetae
Order 1. Chytridiales
Family 1. Rhizidiaceae
Family 2. Olpidiaceae
Family 3. Synchytriaceae
Family 4. Cladochytriaceae
Family 5. Woroninaceae
Order 2. Blastocladiales
Order 3. Monoblepharidales
Order 4. Ancylistales
Order 5. Saprolegniales
Family 1. Saprolegniaceae
Family 2. Leptomitaceae
Family 3. Pythiaceae
Order 6. Peronosporales
Order 7. Mucorales
Order 8. Entomophthorales

Class 2. Ascomycetae
Subclass 1. Protoascomycetae
Subclass 2. Euascomycetae
Order 1. Aspergillales
Order 2. Erysiphales
Order 3. Hysteriales
Order 4. Phacidiales
Order 5. Pezizales
Order 6. Tuberales
Order 7. Helvellales
Order 8. Exoascales
Order 9. Hypocreales
Order 10. Sphaeriales
Order 11. Dothidiales
Order 12. Laboulbeniales

Class 3. Basidiomycetae
Subclass 1. Eubasidii
Order 1. Agaricales (Hymenomyceatae)
Order 2. Lycoperdales (Gasteromycetae)
Order 3. Dacryomycetales
Order 4. Tremellales
Order 5. Auriculariales
Subclass 2. Hemibasidii
Order 1. Urediniales
Order 2. Ustilaginales
Family 1. Ustilaginaceae
Family 2. Tilletiaceae

Class 4. Fungi imperfecti
Lichens
Subclass 1. Ascholichenes
Subclass 2. Basidiolichenes

Division Bryophyta 

Class 1. Hepaticae (liverworts)
Order 1. Sphaerocarpales
Family 1. Sphaerocarpaceae
Family 2. Riellaceae
Order 2. Marchantiales
Family 1. Ricciaceae
Family 2. Corsiniaceae
Family 3. Targioniaceae
Family 4. Monocleaceae
Family 5. Marchantiaceae
Order 3. Jungermanniales
Suborder 1. Metzgerineae
Suborder 2. Jungermannineae
Order 4. Calobryales

Class 2. Anthocerotae (hornworts)
Order 1. Anthocerotales

Class 3. Musci (mosses)
Subclass 1. Sphagnobrya
Subclass 2. Andreaeobrya
Subclass 3. Eubrya

Division Psilophyta 

Class 1. Psilophytinae (psilophytes)
Order 1. Psilophytales
Family 1. Rhyniaceae
Family 2. Psilophytaceae
Family 3. Pseudosporochnaceae
Family 4. Zosterophyllaceae
Family 5. Asteroxylaceae
Order 2. Psilotales

Division Lepidophyta 
Class 1. Lycopodinae (lycopods)
Order 1. Lycopodiales
Family 1. Protolepidodendraceae
Family 2. Lycopodiaceae
Order 2. Selaginellales
Family 1. Selaginellaceae
Family 2. Miadesmiaceae
Order 3. Lepidodendrales
Family 1. Lepidodendraceae
Family 2. Lepidocarpaceae
Family 3. Bothrodendraceae
Family 4. Sigillariaceae
Order 4. Isoetales
Family 1. Pleuromeiaceae
Family 2. Isoetaceae

Division Calamophyta 

Class 1. Equisetinae (horsetails)
Order 1. Hyeniales
Order 2. Sphenophyllales
Order 3. Equisetales
Family 1. Calamitaceae
Family 2. Equisetaceae

Division Pterophyta 

Class 1. Filicinae (ferns)
Subclass 1. Primofilices (or Inversicatenales, Coenopterideae, Palaeopteridales)
Order 1. Protopteridales
Family 1. Protopteridaceae
Family 2. Cladoxylaceae
Order 2. Coenopteridales
Family 1. Zygopteridaceae
Family 2. Botryopteridaceae
Family 3. Anachoropteridaceae
Order 3. Archaeopteridales
Subclass 2. Eusporangitae
Order 1. Ophioglossales
Order 2. Marattiales
Subclass 3. Leptosporangiatae
Order 1. Filicales
Family 1. Osmundaceae
Family 2. Schizaeaceae
Family 3. Gleicheniaceae
Family 4. Matoniaceae
Family 5. Dipteridaceae
Family 6. Hymenophyllaceae
Family 7. Cyatheaceae
Family 8. Dicksoniaceae
Family 9. Polypodiaceae
Family 10. Parkeriaceae
Order 2. Marsileales
Order 3. Salviniales

Systems of plant taxonomy
Systems of algal taxonomy
Systems of fungus taxonomy